Michael Ray Gundy (born August 12, 1967) is an American football coach and former player. He is the head football coach at Oklahoma State University. Gundy played college football at Oklahoma State, where he played quarterback from 1986 to 1989. He became Oklahoma State's coach on January 3, 2005. Gundy and the University of Utah’s Kyle Whittingham are currently the second-longest tenured FBS coaches with one school, trailing only Kirk Ferentz. He is the longest-tenured in the Big 12 Conference.

Playing career
At Midwest City High School, Gundy played quarterback, and was voted Oklahoma Player of the Year in 1986. His high school football coach was Dick Evans. Gundy was heavily recruited by the Oklahoma Sooners but in the end signed with the Oklahoma State University Cowboys. He became the starting quarterback midway through his freshman year. Gundy would become the all-time leading passer in Oklahoma State and Big Eight Conference history. In four seasons Gundy threw 49 touchdowns and 7,997 yards, including 2,106 yards in 1987 and 2,163 in 1988. He led the Cowboys to bowl wins in the 1987 Sun Bowl and 1988 Holiday Bowl aided by two Hall of Fame running backs: Thurman Thomas and Barry Sanders. He also led OSU to two 10-win seasons.

Mike Gundy held the record for most consecutive passes attempted without an interception at the start of a career by a freshman in Division 1 history with 138, until Baylor freshman Robert Griffin III broke it in 2008. Coincidentally, Baylor was playing against Gundy's Oklahoma State team when Griffin surpassed the mark. After the game, Gundy was able to personally congratulate Griffin on the accomplishment.

Gundy holds a degree in secondary education with a focus in social studies and graduated in 1990.

Coaching career

Early positions
When Gundy graduated, he joined Pat Jones' staff as an assistant coach. He was wide receiver coach in 1990, quarterback coach from 1991–1993 and offensive coordinator from 1994–1995.

Gundy was quarterbacks coach/passing game coordinator for Baylor during the 1996 season. He was on staff with Larry Fedora at Baylor and would rekindle that relationship when he became head coach at Oklahoma State, bringing Fedora on as his offensive coordinator. After the 1996 season, Gundy moved again, this time to Maryland where he was wide receiver coach and passing game coordinator from 1997–2000 for the Terps.

Oklahoma State
In 2001, the Oklahoma State University head football coach job became vacant when Bob Simmons resigned and a search produced Les Miles and Mike Gundy as the finalists. Miles was hired as head coach and Gundy was brought aboard as offensive coordinator. The team would go on to three straight bowl games in Miles' last three years as head coach. When Miles left in 2004 to take the LSU job, Gundy was named immediately as Miles' successor and the 22nd head coach at Oklahoma State. Gundy is one of three head football coaches at Oklahoma State to have played for Oklahoma State, along with Jim Lookabaugh and Floyd Gass.

Gundy's first season saw the expulsion of eleven players from the team and the Cowboys struggled to a 4–7 record winning only one Big 12 conference game.

In his second season, the Cowboy offense began to click and the Cowboys would finish 7–6 including a victory over the Alabama Crimson Tide in the Independence Bowl.

In 2007, the Cowboys again posted a 6–6 regular season record and a bowl win over the Indiana Hoosiers in the Insight Bowl. After their second straight bowl appearance, Gundy was rewarded with a contract extension through the 2013 season. From 2008 through 2017, Gundy led the Cowboys to 96 wins, almost 10 wins per season on average. Many people would consider this to be the most successful period in Oklahoma State football history. He has also led the Pokes to sixteen straight bowl seasons, another Cowboy record.

2008 season
In 2008, Gundy led the Oklahoma State Cowboys to their best season in 20 years. They were ranked in the top 15 for most of the season. The season ended with an appearance in the Holiday Bowl, where they lost to Oregon. Gundy was rewarded with a new seven-year contract worth $15.7 million. The contract, which extended through the 2015 season, went into effect on January 1, 2009.

2011 season
Thus far the high-water mark for Gundy, the Cowboys won the Big 12 championship, the program's first conference championship since 1976 (when they tied as co-champions) and first outright conference championship since 1948. The team featured two-time Biletnikoff Award winner Justin Blackmon and quarterback Brandon Weeden, both first-round draft picks in the 2012 NFL Draft, as well as a defense that led the FBS in turnover margin

The team also appeared in the program's only BCS game, defeating Andrew Luck and the Stanford Cardinal 41–38 in overtime at the 2012 Fiesta Bowl.

2011–present
On September 24, Gundy's Cowboys survived a fourth-quarter rally by Texas A&M to win 30–29. It was Gundy's 63rd win as head coach of the Cowboys, vaulting him past Jones to become the winningest coach in school history.

He has since led Oklahoma State to 12 wins in 2011, and 10-win seasons in 2013, 2015, 2016 and 2017, including an appearance in the 2016 Sugar Bowl–the third major-bowl appearance in school history. Gundy has had a hand in eight of Oklahoma State's nine 10-win seasons–two as a player, six as head coach.

In October 2020, Gundy signed a new “perpetual” or rolling 5-year contract.

Bedlam Series Oklahoma rivalry
After the 2012 season, the Cowboys are 3–15 vs. the Oklahoma Sooners under Gundy as head coach. They won in 2011, 2014 and 2021.  Gundy has been associated with the series 32 times as a player or a coach.

Controversies

2007 dispute with the media
On September 22, 2007, Gundy made comments that became the subject of a nationwide media controversy and generated a viral video. During a press conference following his team's victory over the Texas Tech Red Raiders, Gundy criticized an article by Jenni Carlson of The Oklahoman. The article contained guesses as to why quarterback Bobby Reid, who had been publicly supported by the coaching staff earlier in the year, was demoted to second-string. Gundy condemned the article as a personal attack on a young player and offered himself as a better target for criticism when he shouted "Come after me! I'm a man! I'm forty!" Gundy has stated that he does not mind criticizing college athletes' on-field performance but does not appreciate critiquing college athletes otherwise. The Oklahoman sports editor, Mike Sherman, stood by the story. Mike Griffith, president of the Football Writers Association of America, called Gundy's behavior "completely inappropriate." CBS Sportsline's Dennis Dodd went further saying, "Mike Gundy needs to be reprimanded, definitely suspended, probably fined and maybe fired." OSU athletic director Mike Holder stood behind Gundy, saying that "nothing is more important to us than our student-athletes." Gundy would later state that the incident was a blessing in disguise, as the image of his strident defense of one of his players had a lasting positive effect on recruiting.

2013 allegations of misconduct
In September 2013, Sports Illustrated published a series of articles as part of an investigation beginning with Les Miles' tenure as head coach at Oklahoma State from 2001 and continuing through Gundy's tenure as head coach in 2011. The allegations concerning Gundy included involvement in a bonus system for players along with direct payments and no-show or sham jobs involving boosters, continuing diminished academic standards including players playing who were otherwise academically ineligible such as having players' school work done by so-called tutors and other school personnel, tolerating widespread drug abuse among the players by continuing a sham drug counseling program and selective drug enforcement, and also purportedly like Miles, personally interviewing hostess candidates for the Orange Pride hostess program and facilitating some hostesses having sex with prospective recruits. In response to the allegations, Gundy stated: "I’m very proud of what we’ve accomplished here, both on and off the field. Our goal has always been to take young people from where their parents have gotten them and to make them better over a four- or five-year period. We’re very proud of that in many ways. So, until further time—and obviously the university will make that decision—there’s not any comment that we would have on the Sports Illustrated article." Les Miles generally denied any wrongdoing during his time as head coach at OSU.
Following the SI series Oklahoma State conducted an intensive review of practices policies led by Charles Smart. There were no findings of misconduct of any significance found. Many current and former players, professors, and supporters have made statements refuting the SI articles.

2020 One America News incident
In June of 2020, highly prospected star running back Chuba Hubbard threatened to boycott Oklahoma State after Gundy was photographed wearing a t-shirt of One America News, which Gundy has supported in previous statements. Linebacker Amen Ogbongbemiga also threatened to sit in response to the photo. Gundy subsequently issued an apology, saying he was "disgusted" by OAN's attitude towards the Black Lives Matter movement. In light of the controversy, Gundy suggested taking a $1M pay cut and agreed to other concessions concluding the incident. Hubbard eventually apologized for the way he handled the situation

Personal life
Gundy and his wife, Kristen, have three children, Gavin, Gunnar and Gage. His brother, Cale Gundy, was a starting quarterback at Oklahoma in the 1990s and was OU's Assistant Head Coach, Director of Recruiting and Inside Receivers Coach. Gundy has also accrued fame for his "million-dollar mullet."
In 2021 Gundy was inducted into the Oklahoma Sports Hall of Fame.

Head coaching record

References

External links

 
 Oklahoma State profile

1967 births
Living people
American football quarterbacks
Baylor Bears football coaches
Maryland Terrapins football coaches
Oklahoma State Cowboys football coaches
Oklahoma State Cowboys football players
People from Midwest City, Oklahoma
Sportspeople from Oklahoma County, Oklahoma
Coaches of American football from Oklahoma
Players of American football from Oklahoma